Westhead is a village in Lancashire, England.

Westhead or West Head may also refer to:

Westhead (surname), a family name derived from the village of Westhead
Westhead Halt railway station, a disused railway station in Westhead
West Head, three separate headlands on New Zealand's South Island
West Head, Nova Scotia, a community in Nova Scotia, Canada
West Head of Papa, one of the Scalloway Islands in Shetland, Scotland